In the 2016–17 season, CA Batna is competing in the Ligue 1 for the 23rd season, as well as the Algerian Cup.

Non-competitive

Pre-season

Mid-season

Overview

Ligue 1

League table

Results summary

Results by round

Matches

Algerian Cup

Squad information

Playing statistics

|-
! colspan=14 style=background:#dcdcdc; text-align:center| Goalkeepers

|-
! colspan=14 style=background:#dcdcdc; text-align:center| Defenders

|-
! colspan=14 style=background:#dcdcdc; text-align:center| Midfielders

|-
! colspan=14 style=background:#dcdcdc; text-align:center| Forwards

|-
! colspan=14 style=background:#dcdcdc; text-align:center| Players transferred out during the season

Goalscorers

Suspensions

Clean sheets

Squad list
''As of January 15, 2017

Transfers

In

Summer

Winter

Out

Summer

Winter

References

CA Batna seasons
CA Batna